Flavio Alejandro de Luna Dávila (born January 26, 1990) is a Mexican cyclist, who last rode for UCI Continental team .

Major results
Source: 

2010
 1st Stage 5 Vuelta Mexico Telmex
 7th Overall Vuelta a la Independencia Nacional
2013
 4th Road race, National Road Championships
2014
 2nd Time trial, National Road Championships
 8th Overall Tour of the Gila
2015
 1st  Time trial, National Road Championships
2016
 4th Road race, National Road Championships
2017
 4th Time trial, National Road Championships
2018
 4th Time trial, National Road Championships
2021
 3rd Road race, National Road Championships

References

External links

1990 births
Living people
Mexican male cyclists
Sportspeople from Aguascalientes
21st-century Mexican people
20th-century Mexican people